Ras Lanuf Oil Airport  is an airport in the Sirte District of Libya, located on the Mediterranean coast  south-southwest of Benghazi. Its primary use is the transportation of oilfield workers from production facilities in the area.

The Ras Lanuf V40 non-directional beacon (Ident: VR) is located on the field.

World War II
During World War II the airfield, then known as Hamraiet Airfield was used as a military airfield by the United States Army Air Force Ninth Air Force 57th Fighter Group during the North African Campaign against Axis forces. The 57th flew P-40 Warhawks from the airfield between 3–19 January 1943 before moving forward with the British Eighth Army.

Further reading
 Maurer, Maurer. Air Force Combat Units of World War II. Maxwell AFB, Alabama: Office of Air Force History, 1983. 521 p. .

See also
Transport in Libya
List of airports in Libya

References

External links
OpenStreetMap - Ras Lanuf Oil Airport
OurAirports - Ras Lanuf
SkyVector - Ras Lanuf
FallingRain - Ras Lanuf Oil Airport

Airport
Airports in Libya
Tripolitania
Airfields of the United States Army Air Forces in Libya